A chavurah or chaburah  (חבורה Hebrew: "fellowship", plural chavurot) is a small group of like-minded Jews who assemble for the purposes of facilitating Shabbat and holiday prayer services, sharing communal experiences such as lifecycle events, or Jewish learning.

Chavurot usually provide autonomous alternatives to established Jewish institutions and Jewish denominations. 
Many chavurot place an emphasis on egalitarianism in the broad sense (of which gender egalitarianism is one piece), depending on participation by the entire community rather than top-down direction by clergy.

Origins
The first chavurah in the United States was formed in September 1960 in Whittier, California. However, most chavurot in America had their origins in the North American Jewish counter-cultural trends of the late 1960s and early 1970s. During this period, groups of young rabbis, academics, and political activists founded experimental chavurot for prayer and study, in reaction to what they perceived as an over-institutionalized and unspiritual North American Jewish establishment. Initially the main inspiration was the pietistic fellowships of the Pharisees and other ancient Jewish sects.

Initially some of these groups, like the Boston-area Havurat Shalom, attempted to function as full-fledged rural communes after the model of their secular counterparts. Others formed as communities within the urban or suburban Jewish establishment. Although the leadership and ritual privileges were initially men-only, as in Orthodox Jewish practice, the second-wave feminism soon led to the full integration of women in these communities.

Literature
Apart from some tentative articles in Response and other Jewish student magazines, the early chavurot attracted little attention in the wider North American Jewish community. Then, in 1973, Michael and Sharon Strassfeld released The Jewish Catalog: A Do-It-Yourself Kit.  Patterned after the recently published counter-culture Whole Earth Catalog, the book served both as a basic reference on Judaism and American Jewish life, as well as a playful compendium of Jewish crafts, recipes, meditational practices, and political action ideas, all aimed at disaffected young Jewish adults. The Jewish Catalog became one of the best-selling books in American Jewish history to that date and spawned two sequels. A much more widespread chavurah movement soon emerged, including self-governing chavurot within Reform, Conservative and Reconstructionist synagogues.

Present
Present-day chavurot include some chavurot that have functioned continuously since the 1970s, such as Fabrangen and Havurat Shalom, as well as a resurgent wave in independent Jewish communities that have been established post-2000.  Both generations of chavurot gather annually at the National chavurah Committee's Summer Institute and at its regional retreats.

Origin of term
The concept of a chavurah has ancient roots. The Talmud (Tractate Pesachim) uses the term chavurah to identify the group of people registered for a single Passover korban (sacrifice), and who held a Seder together, in the days of the Temple in Jerusalem. The Passover Seder is perhaps the prototypical group ritual (traditionally) held outside a synagogue involving the sharing of communal experiences, Jewish learning, and prayer.

References

Notes

External links
chavurah Directory
National chavurah Committee

 
Non-denominational Judaism
1960 establishments in California
Jewish organizations established in 1960
Counterculture of the 1960s
Judaism in the United States
Whittier, California
Hebrew words and phrases